Robert Venters Paterson (10 October 1875 – 9 July 1960) was an  Australian rules footballer who played with Geelong in the Victorian Football League (VFL).

Notes

External links 

1875 births
1960 deaths
Australian rules footballers from Victoria (Australia)
Geelong Football Club (VFA) players
Geelong Football Club players